Dwayne Jenner (born 17 November 1990, in Benoni) is a South African rugby union player, who most recently played with the . His regular position is centre.

Career

Sharks

He was named in their squad for the 2011 Vodacom Cup, but failed to make an appearance.

Border Bulldogs

He joined the East London-based  during 2011. He made five appearances for them before dropping down to the Under-21 side. He made three appearances for the  side during the 2011 Under-21 Provincial Championship competition, scoring a try in their Semi-final match against .

His made his Vodacom Cup debut during the 2012 Vodacom Cup, with his start against Argentinian side  being one of five appearances in the competition.

Eastern Province Kings

He joined the  prior to the 2014 season. In June 2014, he was selected on the bench for the  side to face  during a tour match during a 2014 incoming tour. He made his debut for the EP Kings when he came on as a late substitute in a 12–34 defeat.

References

South African rugby union players
Living people
1990 births
People from Benoni
Border Bulldogs players
Eastern Province Elephants players
Sharks (Currie Cup) players
Rugby union players from Gauteng
Rugby union centres